Sąspówka is a river of Poland, a tributary of the Prądnik at Ojców.

Rivers of Poland
Rivers of Lesser Poland Voivodeship